Mohanbhai Kalyanjibhai Kundariya (born 6 September 1951) is an Indian politician and a former Union Minister of State for Agriculture and Farmer Welfare in the Government of India. He was also elected to Gujarat Legislative Assembly from Tankara assembly constituency of Rajkot district.

Career
He served as Minister of State from May 2014 to 5 July 2016.

Personal life
Twelve of Kundariya's family members, including his sister, were killed during the 2022 Morbi bridge collapse.

References

Living people
India MPs 2014–2019
Bharatiya Janata Party politicians from Gujarat
Lok Sabha members from Gujarat
People from Rajkot district
Narendra Modi ministry
1951 births
India MPs 2019–present